Sharon Belle (born May 7, 1992) is a Canadian actress, best known for her role in the web series Carmilla and Couple-ish.

Early life 
Belle grew up in Keswick, Ontario. She later moved to Toronto and studied Acting on Film and Television at Humber College. After this she appeared in several films and on stage at the Alumnae Theatre and Buddies in Bad Times Theatre.

Career 
Belle first gained popularity in 2014 for her portrayal of Danny Lawrence in the web series Carmilla. In 2015, Belle was placed 46th on AfterEllen's Hot 100 List, beating stars like Emma Stone. 

In 2016, Belle appeared in the web series Couple-ish. She played Rachel, a queer Londoner who wants to stay in Toronto although her visa has expired.

Personal life 
In addition to working as an actor, Belle also plays the guitar. She speaks French and English.

Filmography

References

External links

1992 births
Living people
Actresses from Ontario
Canadian film actresses
Canadian television actresses
Canadian web series actresses
People from Georgina, Ontario
21st-century Canadian actresses